Dunraven may refer to:
Earl of Dunraven and Mount-Earl, title in the peerage of Ireland, held by seven earls from 1822 to 2011 
Dunraven Castle, mansion on the South Wales coast belonging to the Wyndham family and passing by marriage to the earls of Dunraven  
HMS Dunraven, British Royal Navy ship during World War I
SS Dunraven, ship sunk in the Red Sea in 1876
Dunraven School, London
Dunraven, Kentucky
Dunraven Peak, mountain peak in the Washburn Range of Yellowstone National Park, named in honour of the Fourth Earl
Dunraven Pass, mountain pass in Yellowstone National Park, near to Dunraven Peak
Dunraven Street, Mayfair, London, named after the Earl of Dunraven